Communesin B is a cytotoxic fungi isolate.

References

Epoxides